Erin is an unincorporated community in McDowell County, West Virginia, United States. Erin is located on U.S. Route 52.

References 

Unincorporated communities in McDowell County, West Virginia
Unincorporated communities in West Virginia